Lőrinc Schlauch (27 March 1824 – 10 July 1902) was a Hungarian Roman Catholic cardinal and archbishop during 19th and 20th century.

He was born in Arad in the Banat region of the Austrian Empire and was a son of Lorenz von Linden. He was appointed as a chaplain in 1847 and from 25 July 1873 to 26 May 1886, he was bishop of the Szatmárnémeti diocese.

He was created a cardinal in the consistory on 12 June 1893 by Pope Leo XIII with the title of San Girolamo dei Croati. From 1886 until his death in Nagyvárad in 1902, he served as bishop of the Nagyvárad diocese.

See also 
 Cardinals created by Pope Leo XIII

References

 

1824 births
1902 deaths
People from Arad, Romania
20th-century Hungarian cardinals
19th-century Hungarian cardinals
Cardinals created by Pope Leo XIII